D.C. College, Hajipur is a Constituent College of Babasaheb Bhimrao Ambedkar Bihar University. It is located in Hajipur, Vaishali district, Bihar, India.

Access
Distance from nearest places of Hajipur  to the college is as follows:
 1.4 km distance from Ramashish Chowk Bus Stand 
 3.1 km distance from Hajipur Court,  Gandhi Chowk  Hajipur

Railway station distance
 1.5 km distance from Hajipur Junction railway station
 7.1 km distance from Sonpur railway station

References

Universities and colleges in Bihar
Education in Hajipur
Educational institutions established in 1968
1968 establishments in India